The Ferris House is a historic house located at 16 Carillon Road in Ticonderoga, Essex County, New York.

Description and history 
Designed by W. A. Gale, it was built in 1911 and is a -story, four-bay-wide, hipped roof Colonial Revival–style building with clapboard sheathing and a stone foundation. It features a three-bay-wide, one-story flat-roofed porch with Doric order columns. Also on the property are a contributing carriage house and playhouse.

It was listed on the National Register of Historic Places on November 15, 1988.

References

Houses on the National Register of Historic Places in New York (state)
Colonial Revival architecture in New York (state)
Houses completed in 1911
Houses in Essex County, New York
National Register of Historic Places in Essex County, New York